The antimicrobial spectrum of an antibiotic means the range of microorganisms it can kill or inhibit. Antibiotics can be divided into broad-spectrum antibiotics, extended-spectrum antibiotics and narrow-spectrum antibiotics based on their spectrum of activity. Detailedly, broad-spectrum antibiotics can kill or inhibit a wide range of microorganisms; extended-spectrum antibiotic can kill or inhibit Gram positive bacteria and some Gram negative bacteria; narrow-spectrum antibiotic can only kill or inhibit limited species of bacteria.

Currently no antibiotic's spectrum can completely cover all types of microorganisms.

Determination
The antimicrobial spectrum of an antibiotic can be determined by testing its antimicrobial activity against a wide range of microbes in vitro . Nonetheless, the range of microorganisms which an antibiotic can kill or inhibit in vivo may not always be the same as the antimicrobial spectrum based on data collected in vitro.

Significance
Narrow-spectrum antibiotics have low propensity to induce bacterial resistance and are less likely to disrupt the microbiome (normal microflora).  On the other hand, indiscriminate use of broad-spectrum antibiotics may not only induce the development of bacterial resistance and promote the emergence of multidrug-resistant organisms, but also cause off-target effects due to dysbiosis. They may also have side effects, such as diarrhea or rash. Generally, a broad antibiotic has more clinical indications, and therefore are more widely used.  The Healthcare Infection Control Practices Advisory Committee (HICPAC) recommends the use of narrow-spectrum antibiotics whenever possible.

Examples
 Broad-spectrum antibiotic:  Ciprofloxacin, Doxycycline, Minocycline, Tetracycline, Imipenem, Azithromycine
 Extended-spectrum antibiotic: Ampicillin
 Narrow-spectrum antibiotic: Sarecycline, Vancomycin, Isoniazid

See also
 Antibiotic
 Methicillin-resistant Staphylococcus aureus (MRSA)

References

Antibiotics
Clinical pharmacology